The Association of Young Legal Historians (AYLH); Its main purposes are the organisation of the annual conference "Forum of Young Legal Historians", the publication of the "Yearbook of Young Legal History" and the facilitation of communication within the scientific community between the annual conferences. The "Association of Young Legal Historians" emerged from the "Forum of Young European Legal Historians", which met for the first time in Frankfurt in 1992.

History 
The "European Forum of Young Legal Historians" had grown into the leading conference for up-and-coming legal historians. Its origins were two international meetings in Frankfurt am Main in the early 1990s. It was Michael Stolleis who, with the funds of the Gottfried Wilhelm Leibniz Prize, invited young legal historians from East and West to a first meeting in Frankfurt in 1992 at the Max Planck Institute for European Legal History. His intention was to bring the discipline together in the wake of the fall of the Berlin Wall. The initiative soon became an institution: the so-called "Forum junger Rechtshistoriker", which met for the first time in Halle in 1995, took place in Berlin in 1996 and called itself the "Europäisches Forum junger Rechtshistorikerinnen und Rechtshistoriker" in Graz in 1997. The 1999 Zürich meeting marked the break-through towards a truly European event. More than a hundred participants from Europe and beyond came together to attend presentations in the German, English, French and Italian languages. Since then, young researchers from countries which had not been reached before visited the conference in increasing numbers. Again a few years later, the addition "Europäisches" was dropped. In the meantime the Forum has become a meeting place for young legal historians from all over the world.

The notion of "young" legal historians is understood in a broad sense. The "Forum of Young Legal Historians" is primarily designed to give all those a chance to present the results of their studies who would not otherwise have the opportunity to do so. As the academic hierarchies tend to affect the free expression of younger researchers, professors holding a chair in legal history are, as a general rule, excluded from participation to the conference. Similarly, professors and organisations who wish to support the objectives of the society may not vote in the general assembly of the AYLH.

Another special feature of the AYLH is the avoiding of any competing for positions within the association. The executive committee simply consists of the organizers of the last, and the next Fora.

Annual fora

References

External links
 Website of the AYLH

Youth organizations based in Europe
Legal historians